The coronation of James I and his wife Anne as King and Queen of England was held on 25 July 1603 at Westminster Abbey. James had reigned as King James VI of Scotland since 1567. Anne was anointed and consecrated with prayers alluding to Esther, the Wise Virgins, and other Biblical heroines. It was the first coronation to be conducted in English instead of Latin. A planned ceremonial Royal Entry to London was deferred until 15 March 1604.

Background and preparations 
After the death of Elizabeth I, James VI of Scotland became King of England, an event known as the Union of the Crowns. He had been crowned King of Scotland on 29 July 1567 at Stirling. His wife, Anne of Denmark, had been crowned in Edinburgh on 17 May 1590.

James rode to England and arrived at Theobalds on 3 May 1603. His wife Anne followed, after suffering a miscarriage at Stirling Castle. Plans for the coronation were disrupted by an outbreak of plague. The number of guests and officials allowed within the Abbey was strictly limited. The subdued nature of this coronation was noted, and three years later a ceremony at Windsor Castle to invest the Earl of Salisbury and Viscount Bindon as Knights of the Garter was said to have been much more magnificent. More recently, historians have reassessed the importance of the event and the priorities of King James.

A commission was established to adjudicate any competing claims to hereditary or feudal rights to offices and services at the ceremony. The commissioners declared on 18 July that the traditional procession through the city would be severely curtailed. There was no customary feast. The date of the ceremony was kept because it was auspicious as the feast day of Saint James, the king's name saint, and, according to the Venetian diplomat Scaramelli, political events including the main and bye plots made James anxious to take the coronation oaths and so "settle his affairs".

Sir George Carew bought 156 gilt halberds for the royal guard at the coronation and "tilt staves" and other equipment for jousting or "running at the ring" at a coronation tournament. A new imperial crown was made. The goldsmiths William Herrick and John Spilman provided a cloth-of-estate for the Abbey embroidered with pearls and imitation counterfeit gemstones. They made a jewelled circlet for Anne of Denmark, and refashioned the armill, ampulla, and sceptre for the ceremony. Some of the gems for the circlet were taken from the jewels of Elizabeth I.

The Commission made its decisions on rights and honours on 24 July. It refrained from deciding on some claims, including that of Sir Oliver Leigh, who as lord of the manor of Addington in Surrey, alleged to be entitled to provide the royals with a mess or dish of "herout or pigernout" made in the royal kitchen. His ancestor, Nicholas Leigh, had claimed the same right to "make a mess of pottage in a pot of clay" at the coronation of Mary I of England in 1553.

For his security, James requested 100 soldiers from the trained bands of Surrey. 500 soldiers were hired at eight pence per day to guard against "any tumults and disorder" in Westminster and the Strand. The Chancellor of the Exchequer and Master of the Wardrobe, John Fortescue of Salden was in charge of £5000 spent on the coronation, and £3000 spent on the funeral of Elizabeth I.

Doctrinal issues
The English Reformation had made the form of the coronation service problematic, as previous coronations included Roman Catholic rites. On 15 May 1603, the Venetian ambassador reported that the College of Heralds was scouring the archives for precedents. It was decided to make a translation of the Liber Regalis, the 14th-century manuscript of the coronation order, ignoring the elaborations of the service which had been added during the Tudor dynasty and deleting any elements that were contrary to Anglican doctrine. The driving force behind this decision may have been the antiquary William Camden, Clarenceux King of Arms and the librarian of Westminster Abbey. Camden was one of a number of scholars postulating that the new Church of England was the inheritor of an ancient and pure tradition of English Christian worship. However, the final decision on the order of service was made by John Whitgift, the Archbishop of Canterbury. The majority of the liturgy was translated into English, but some elements, such as the Litany, were retained in the original Latin. The coronation oath was to be made in Latin, English and French, because of the claim to the French throne.

The coronation 
On Sunday 24 July, James created a number of new Knights of the Bath in the gallery of Whitehall Palace. The next day, James and Anne embarked on a gilded royal barge at Whitehall Steps, located near the present-day Horse Guards Avenue, and travelled the short distance upriver to a jetty at Westminster, known as Westminster Bridge or Westminster Hall Bridge (not to be confused with the later 18th-century westminster Bridge), walking first to Westminster Hall. It was raining. Despite a royal proclamation that spectators should stay away because of an outbreak of bubonic plague, the streets around the abbey and numerous boats on the river were crowded with onlookers. The purple velvet train of the queen's gown was held by one of her ladies and her chamberlain, an honour disputed by two rival claimants, Edward de Vere, 17th Earl of Oxford and Daniel Cage, whose father had acquired Great Hormead, one of the manors attached to the chamberlain's office. The ambition of Daniel Cage (died 1634) to act as the queen's page in the procession was not realised.

The ceremony was described by the Venetian diplomat Scaramelli and others including Giovanni degli Effetti, an agent  of the Papal nuncio in France, Innocenzo del Buffalo, and Benjamin von Buwinckhausen, a diplomat from the Duchy of Württemberg.

Scaramelli (who did not attend in person) described a procession of heralds, followed by the mayor, Robert Lee, and city dignitaries, lawyers and judges, the Knights of the Bath, and aristocrats. King James entered walking under a canopy, followed by members of his household and halbardiers of the royal guard. Anne of Denmark walked under similar canopy, dressed robes of crimson velvet lined with ermine, accompanied by Arbella Stuart, preceded by a dozen countesses in pairs carrying coronets including Lucy Russell, Countess of Bedford, Helena Snakenborg, Marchioness of Northampton, and the Countess of Cumberland, her household following. James and Anne were seated before the high altar on a pair of chairs. James was crowned by the Archbishop of Canterbury, John Whitgift. He changed into the ancient robes which were said to have belonged to Edward the Confessor. He was then seated on the Coronation Chair containing the Stone of Scone on an octagonal dais. After Anne was crowned she was seated beside him on a "somewhat lower" throne. James took communion as indicated in the order of service, Anne did not. Scaramelli was told that the issue of taking the sacrament had been discussed in the morning and the queen had emphatically refused. Thomas Bilson gave the sermon.

Scaramelli says that the earls came forward to do homage by touching the crown, and Philip Herbert, Earl of Montgomery, and royal favourite, gave the king a kiss on his cheek. James dismissed him with a slap, a "little cuff" or schiaffetto in the original Italian.

Music
No detailed description of the music used at the coronation has survived. The procession on foot between Westminster Hall and Westminster Abbey was probably accompanied by the anthem, O Lord, grant the King a long life, the text taken from Psalm 61, set to music by either by Thomas Weelkes or Thomas Tomkins. The processional anthem inside the abbey was Behold, our Lord and protector; after the Recognition, Let thy hand be strengthened; during the Anointing, Veni Creator and Zadok the Priest; and after the crowning, Be strong and of good courage and The King shall rejoice both combined into one piece. It is unclear who wrote the music for these, except for the last which is generally attributed to Tomkins. The composer William Byrd was still a prominent Gentleman of the Chapel Royal in 1603 and it is almost certain that he also contributed.

Costume

The Commissioners had allowed the Earl of Oxford his right as High Chamberlain to dress the king. According to Giovanni degli Effetti, James was dressed in a similar manner to the Earls, wearing a crimson velvet cloak over a velvet coat lined with ermine, and a velvet and ermine cap. The earls wore gold coronets in the place of a hat band. Probably, James' outfit was created by his Scottish tailor Alexander Miller, who had come to London in the royal entourage.

The National Museum of Scotland has a period wooden model of James possibly represented wearing his coronation robes. A portrait by Paul van Somer (c.1620) shows the king in his ermine lined robes over white satin doublet and breeches, with a view of the Whitehall Banqueting House behind him.

Anne of Denmark's coronation costume was made of crimson and purple velvet lined with powdered ermines, and perfumed with musk, civet, and ambergris. An Order of Service mentions (in Latin) that her costume would be unadorned with embroidery (a detail noted by Giovanni degli Effetti), her hair loose about her shoulders, with the gem-set gold circlet on her head. It was traditional for queens consort and queens regnant including Elizabeth I and Mary I to wear their hair loose at their coronation.

To orchestrate the costumes of the earls and countesses, the Earl of Nottingham and the Special Commissioners for the Coronation had sent directions on 7 July and the royal wardrobe issued the scarlet fabric. Gold coronets for the Earl and Countess of Shrewsbury cost £50. The Earl of Shrewsbury, as holder of the manor of Farnham Royal, had the honour to support the king's right arm during the procession.

Portraits of countesses in their ermine gowns show two styles of skirt. Lucy, Countess of Bedford, in her portrait now at Gripsholm Castle, wears an older conical French-style farthingale, while the pictures of the Countess of Northampton and another lady show the current fashion of drum or French-wheel farthingales. The costume historian Janet Arnold noted that extensive use of ermine, especially as the forepart of the skirt, echoes the Parliament robes of Elizabeth as depicted on her marble effigy by Maximilian Colt in the Abbey and the countesses' clothes may have resembled those then visible in the Abbey on Elizabeth's wooden funerary effigy.

Buwinckhausen wrote that the countesses wore scarlet dresses in "antique fashion" trimmed with ermine, their coronets in the left hand. "Antique fashion", the phrase used in Brenchley Rye's translation, usually meant classical Roman style, but Giovanni degli Effetti said the gowns were in modern style. Buwinckhausen's original German phrase may refer to the countess' wide sleeves having some similarity to Franconian fashion, or to their paired costumes resembling the red and white heraldry of Franconia; "mit Hermelin gefuttert, und weiten Ermelen gar altfrenckisch".

Lady Anne Clifford's parents attended in their robes as Earl of Countess of Cumberland. They had hosted the King and Queen at Grafton Regis in June. At this time the Countess of Cumberland was estranged from the Earl and he was not maintaining her. She had to write to Sir Robert Cecil asking for his intervention so that she could buy suitable clothes to "furnish her self" to attend Anne of Denmark. Anne Clifford's cousin Frances Bourchier (1587-1612) was a spectator at the coronation, but Anne herself was not allowed to attend for fear of the plague in the city. She remained at Norbury, south of London. In September, Frances Bourchier joined Princess Elizabeth at Nonsuch Palace.

Progresses
After the ceremony, the royals went to Westminster Palace, and on the following day, to Hampton Court. After a stay at Richmond Palace, they went Woodstock Palace in Oxfordshire. The court then travelled west to Winchester and Wilton House, to avoid the continuing plague in London. The July St James Fair and the August Bartholomew Fair in London were cancelled.

Prisons and pardons
When James entered the Tower of London on 11 May, prisoners were released including some Jesuits. It was expected that King James would order the release of some prisoners in London jails as a token of his clemency on his coronation day. A prisoner at Newgate wrote that the pardon had not been received on 25 July and might not be extended to Catholic prisoners. Prisoners in the common gaol at Newgate were dying of plague.<ref>HMC Rutland', vol. 1 (London, 1888), p. 392.</ref>

Royal Entry to London and accession day

Some preparations for the coronation were built by the carpenter William Portington, and painted by Leonard Fryer.

Triumphal arches and pageants were erected in London for the coronation, and a royal entry which was deferred to 15 March 1604 because of the plague. John Chamberlain described them under construction in July 1603, and their flimsy nature, "Our pageants are prettily forward, but most of them are such small-timbered gentlemen that they cannot last long, and I doubt not if the plague cease not the sooner they will rot and sink where they stand". The city of London spent at least £4,100 and city companies made contributions, providing stands for their members and banners. The total sum spent on the city pageants is comparable with cost of the coronation robes worn by James and Anne in 1603.

Several of the triumphal arches were designed by a carpenter Stephen Harrison, and illustrated in a festival book commemorating the Royal entry, engraved by William Kip. Thomas Dekker wrote The Magnificent Entertainment, and collaborated with Ben Jonson to produce on entertainments on the day. According to Dekker, "the streets seemed to be paved with men; stalls instead of rich wares were set out with children; open casements filled up with women".

The Entry was described by the Count of Villamediana, the Spanish ambassador and another Venetian diplomat Nicolò Molin. James, Anne of Denmark, and Prince Henry lodged at the Tower of London. The crowds were entertained by bull-baiting and other sports. On Wednesday 15 April James rode the ceremonial route through the city followed by Henry, then Anne on a throne on a carriage pulled by mules, and Arbella Stuart in another carriage.

Dekker's poem Troynovant'' invoked a legend of London as a new Troy or Trinovantum, founded by Brutus, with imagery of James' accession to four kingdoms as a marriage:
Where four great Kingdoms hold a festival.
Troynovant is now a bridal chamber,
Whose roof is gold, floor is of amber,
By virtue of that holy light,
That burns in Hymen's hand, more bright.

A few days later, Parliament was opened with another ceremony, and attendees wore different livery clothes to those at the Entry. James and Henry's Parliament robes were of crimson velvet lined with ermine. There were jousts on Saturday 24 March, celebrated as the king's accession day.

References

External links
 James I and Anne of Denmark: Westminster Abbey
 Thomas Dekker, The magnificent entertainment: giuen to King Iames, Queene Anne his wife, and Henry Frederick the prince (London, 1604): Harry Ransom Center
 The Arches of Triumph, built for James I's entry into London, March 15th 1604: British Library
 Gilbert Dugdale, The Time Triumphant (London, 1604). British Library
 Hans Jakob Breunings von Buchenbach, Relation über seine Sendung nach England im Jahr 1595 (Stuttgart, 1865), pp. 84-90, Buwinckhausen's account of the coronation

James I
Royal entries in Britain
1603 in England
James VI and I
Anne of Denmark
Westminster Abbey